Shir Baba (also Romanized as Shīr Bābā) is a village in Shesh Pir Rural District, Hamaijan District, Sepidan County, Fars Province, Iran. At the 2006 census, its population was 257, in 67 families.

References 

Populated places in Sepidan County